The downy woodpecker (Dryobates pubescens) is a species of woodpecker, the smallest in North America. Downy woodpeckers primarily live in forested areas throughout the United States and Canada, with the exception of deserts in the southwest and the northern tundra. The bird nests in tree cavities and feeds primarily on insects, although it supplements its diet with seeds and berries. The downy woodpecker is very similar in appearance to the hairy woodpecker, although they are not closely related.

Taxonomy
The downy woodpecker was described and illustrated with a hand-coloured plate by the English naturalist Mark Catesby in his The Natural History of Carolina, Florida and the Bahama Islands, which was published between 1729 and 1732. When in 1766 the Swedish naturalist Carl Linnaeus updated his Systema Naturae for the twelfth edition, he included the downy woodpecker, coined the binomial name Picus pubescens and cited Catesby's book. The specific epithet pubescens is the Latin for "pubescent" or "downy". Linnaeus specified the type locality as America septentrionali (North America) but the locality is now restricted to South Carolina. The downy woodpecker was usually placed in either Dendrocopos or Picoides, but a molecular phylogenetic study published in 2015 found that these genera did not form monophyletic groups. In the revised generic classification, the downy woodpecker was placed with four other species in the resurrected genus Dryobates, that had been erected in 1826 by the German naturalist Friedrich Boie with the downy woodpecker as the type species. Within the genus, the downy woodpecker is sister to a clade containing Nuttall's woodpecker (Dryobates nuttalli) and the ladder-backed woodpecker (Dryobates scalaris).

Despite their close resemblance, the downy and hairy woodpeckers are not very closely related; the outward similarity is an example of convergent evolution. Why they evolved this way cannot be explained with confidence; it may be relevant that the species exploit rather different-sized foodstuffs and do not compete very much ecologically.

Seven subspecies are recognized:
 D. p. glacialis (Grinnell, 1910) – southeast Alaska
 D. p. medianus (Swainson, 1832) – central Alaska to east Canada and central and east USA
 D. p. fumidus (Maynard, 1889) – southwest Canada and west Washington
 D. p. gairdnerii (Audubon, 1839) – west Oregon to northwest California
 D. p. turati (Malherbe, 1860) – central Washington to central California
 D. p. leucurus (Hartlaub, 1852) – Rocky Mountains (southeast Alaska to southwest USA)
 D. p. pubescens (Linnaeus, 1766) – southeast USA

Description 

Adult downy woodpeckers are the smallest of North America's woodpeckers, but there are many smaller species elsewhere, especially the piculets. The downy woodpecker is mainly black on the upperparts and wings, with a white back, throat and belly and white spotting on the wings. There is one white bar above the eye, and one below. They have a black tail with white outer feathers barred with black. Adult males have a red patch on the back of the head whereas juvenile birds display a red cap.

The downy woodpecker is virtually identical in plumage pattern to the larger hairy woodpecker, but it can be distinguished from the hairy by the presence of black spots on its white tail feathers and the length of its bill. The downy woodpecker's bill is shorter than its head, whereas the hairy woodpecker's bill is approximately equal to head length.

The downy woodpecker gives a number of vocalizations, including a short pik call. One may identify the woodpecker by the pik-call, counting half a second between piks (a total of four must be heard). The rattle-call is a short burst that sounds similar to a bouncing ball, while that of the hairy woodpecker is a shorter burst of the same amplitude. Like other woodpeckers, it also produces a drumming sound (sounds like four taps ) with its beak as it pecks into trees. Its drums are slower compared to other North American species.

Behavior and ecology

Downy woodpeckers are native to forested areas, mainly deciduous, of North America. Their range consists of most of the United States and Canada, except for the deserts of the southwest and the tundra of the north. Mostly permanent residents, northern birds may migrate further south; birds in mountainous areas may move to lower elevations.

Downy woodpeckers nest in a tree cavity excavated by the nesting pair in a dead tree or limb. In the winter, they roost in tree cavities. Downy woodpeckers forage on trees, picking the bark surface in summer and digging deeper in winter. They mainly eat insects, but they also feed on seeds and berries. They are a natural predator of the European corn borer, a moth that costs the US agriculture industry more than $1 billion annually in crop losses and population control. In winter, especially, downy woodpeckers can often be found in suburban backyards with mature trees where they feed on suet and shelled peanuts provided by mesh birdfeeders.

Gallery

References

External links

 
 Downy woodpecker - Picoides pubescens - USGS Patuxent Bird Identification InfoCenter
 Downy woodpecker Species Account - Cornell Lab of Ornithology
 
 Downy woodpecker Bird Sound at Florida Museum of Natural History

downy woodpecker
Birds of North America
Birds of the United States
Birds of Saint Pierre and Miquelon
downy woodpecker
downy woodpecker
Articles containing video clips